Ferdo Milin (born 15 December 1977) is a Croatian professional football manager and former player.

Managerial career 
Milin was fired by NK Zadar in December 2013.

On 5 January 2022, Milin was appointed manager of Prva HNL club Šibenik. On 12 February 2022, following a 0–5 home defeat to Hrvatski Dragovoljac in the league, he was sacked.

Milin was confirmed as manager of Bosnian Premier League club Posušje on 14 June 2022, on a two-year contract. His first match saw Posušje draw against Velež Mostar on 15 July 2022. Milin was sacked by the club on 19 September 2022, following a series of poor results.

References

External links
 

1977 births
Living people
Sportspeople from Zadar
Association football defenders
Croatian footballers
NK Zadar players
NK Čakovec players
HNK Šibenik players
NK Novalja players
HNK Hajduk Split players
Croatian Football League players
Croatian football managers
NK Zadar managers
HNK Šibenik managers
HŠK Posušje managers
Croatian Football League managers
Premier League of Bosnia and Herzegovina managers
Croatian expatriate football managers
Expatriate football managers in the United Arab Emirates
Croatian expatriate sportspeople in the United Arab Emirates
Expatriate football managers in Bosnia and Herzegovina
Croatian expatriate sportspeople in Bosnia and Herzegovina